Lilia may refer to:

People 
 Lilia (name), including a list of people with the name

Science 
 Lilia: old name for order of plants, now known as Liliales
 Lilia (bug): Name of a genus in the family of Anthocoridae

History 
 Lilia: Pit traps dug by Romans